Kautenbach railway station is a railway station serving Kautenbach, in the commune of Kiischpelt, in northern Luxembourg.  It is operated by Chemins de Fer Luxembourgeois, the state-owned railway company.

The station is situated on Line 10, which connects Luxembourg City to the centre and north of the country.  Kautenbach is a junction, with the main line heading further northwards, towards Gouvy, and a branch line connecting to Wiltz.

External links
 Official CFL page on Kautenbach station
 Rail.lu page on Kautenbach station

Kiischpelt
Railway stations in Luxembourg
Railway stations on CFL Line 10